The sequel/prequel to Kill Doctor Lucky, Save Doctor Lucky is a board game manufactured by Cheapass Games that takes place on the Titanic while it is sinking. Gameplay is similar to Kill Doctor Lucky, except that your goal is to save Doctor Lucky while somebody else is watching. There is also a time limit, and if Doctor Lucky is not saved by that time, everybody loses.

Reviews
Pyramid

References

External links 
Cheapass Games site
Kill Doctor Lucky
Save Doctor Lucky 

Board games
Cheapass Games games